Asgat is a sum of Zavkhan Province in western Mongolia. In 2005, its population was 1,125.

References 

Districts of Zavkhan Province